Stokes Bay (or Stokes' Bay) may refer to:

Stokes Bay (South Australia), a bay on the north coast of Kangaroo Island, Australia
Stokes Bay, South Australia, a locality on the north coast of Kangaroo Island, Australia
Stokes Bay (Ontario), a bay on Bruce Peninsula, Canada
 Stokes Bay, a bay in Hampshire, UK

See also
 Stokes Valley, New Zealand